Caroline Garcia was the defending champion, having won the event in 2013, but she chose to participate at the Mutua Madrid Open instead. 

Sharon Fichman won the tournament, defeating Timea Bacsinszky in the final, 6–2, 6–2.

Seeds

Main draw

Finals

Top half

Bottom half

References 
 Main draw

Open Gdf Suez De Cagnes-Sur-Mer Alpes-Maritimes - Singles